In general physics, delta-v is a change in velocity. The Greek uppercase letter Δ (delta) is the standard mathematical symbol to represent change in some quantity.

Depending on the situation, delta-v can be either a spatial vector (Δv) or scalar (Δv). In either case it is equal to the acceleration (vector or scalar) integrated over time:

Vector version: 
Scalar version: 

If acceleration is constant, the change in velocity can thus be expressed as:

where:
v0 or v0 is initial velocity (at time t0),
v1 or v1 is subsequent velocity (at time t1).

Change in velocity is useful in many cases, such as determining the change in momentum (impulse), where: , where  is momentum and m is mass. 
Physical quantities